Adult Contemporary is a chart published by Billboard ranking the top-performing songs in the United States in the adult contemporary music (AC) market.  In 1978, 17 songs topped the chart, then published under the title Easy Listening, based on playlists submitted by radio stations.

In the first issue of Billboard of the year, Billy Joel reached number one with "Just the Way You Are", replacing "How Deep Is Your Love" by the Bee Gees in the top spot.  Joel had launched his solo career in 1971 and achieved a number of minor hits over the next six years, but his breakthrough to stardom did not come until the release of the album The Stranger in the fall of 1977.  Taken from the album, "Just the Way You Are" won two Grammy Awards, and gave him his first Billboard number one.  He would continue to be a regular on the Easy Listening/Adult Contemporary chart for more than two decades, topping the chart eight times.  His 1993 song "The River of Dreams" would break a 25-year-old record by spending twelve consecutive weeks atop the listing.  In contrast to Joel's lengthy and successful career was that of another act to top the chart for the first time in 1978, the band Toby Beau.  Despite topping the Easy Listening chart and placing highly on the magazine's all-genres listing, the Hot 100, with "My Angel Baby", the band would achieve only two more hit songs before dropping into relative obscurity after 1980.  Similarly jazz trumpeter Chuck Mangione topped the Easy Listening chart for the first time in 1978 and enjoyed a brief period of chart success before falling from public favor in the 1980s.

"Time Passages" by the Scottish singer Al Stewart was the final number one of the year.  It held the top spot for the last eight weeks of 1978, the longest unbroken run atop the chart during the year.  The only act to achieve more than one Easy Listening number one in 1978 was Barry Manilow; as his two chart-toppers only totalled five weeks in the top position, Stewart also had the highest total number of weeks at number one by an act during the year.  Stewart had been a recording artist since the mid-1960s and would remain active for more than forty years, but his U.S. chart success was confined to a three-year period at the end of the 1970s.

Chart history

References

See also
1978 in music
List of artists who reached number one on the U.S. Adult Contemporary chart

1978
1978 record charts